Michael "Mickey" Redstone (born Max Rothstein; April 11, 1902 – April 4, 1987) was an American entrepreneur and founder of the Northeast Theater Corporation, now National Amusements, Inc.

Biography
Redstone was born on April 11, 1902 in Boston, Massachusetts. Born Max Rothstein, he later changed the family name to "Redstone" to avoid association with Jewish gambling boss Arnold Rothstein.

Redstone dropped out of high school to pursue his first business venture, buying a truck and securing a trucking contract with the City of Boston. During this period, he became close with local gambling boss Harry “Doc” Sagansky. In 1934, Redstone and Sagansky started a Boston nightclub, the Mayfair, and purchased a drive-in theater in Valley Stream, Long Island. Both ventures were funded by Sagansky, who contributed “hundreds of thousands of dollars” to Redstone’s businesses. The pair also started a Massachusetts loan company, and opened an additional night club, the Latin Quarter, in 1943.

In 1936, Redstone established the Northeast Theater Corporation, which grew rapidly as Redstone purchased land throughout the northeast and built new drive-in theaters. By 1954, when his son Sumner left his job to work for the company, Redstone owned three drive-in theaters and had hired his son Edward to help with the business. On August 28, 1959, Northeast was reincorporated as National Amusements, Inc. to consolidate the family's ownership interests and make it easier to obtain financing.

His son, Sumner Redstone, grew National Amusements into one of the largest media conglomerates in the United States, owning one of the three broadcast networks in CBS, the cable television and content provider Viacom (which includes MTV Networks and BET), and the movie studio Paramount Pictures. CBS and Viacom  are equal partners in MovieTickets.com.

References

External links
National Amusements

1902 births
1987 deaths
20th-century American Jews
Michael
20th-century American businesspeople